Racotis squalida is a species of moth of the family Geometridae first described by Arthur Gardiner Butler in 1878. It is found in central, eastern and southern Africa.

Subspecies
Racotis squalida squalida (Butler, 1878)
Racotis squalida uhligi (Strand, 1909)

References

External links

 "Racotis squalida (Butler, 1878)". African Moths. Retrieved January 24, 2019. With images and a distribution map.

Ennominae
Moths described in 1878
Lepidoptera of West Africa
Lepidoptera of Mozambique
Insects of the Central African Republic
Lepidoptera of the Republic of the Congo
Moths of São Tomé and Príncipe
Lepidoptera of Tanzania
Moths of Sub-Saharan Africa
Taxa named by Arthur Gardiner Butler